Pyreneola is a genus of sea snails, marine gastropod mollusks in the family Columbellidae, the dove snails.

Species
Species within the genus Pyreneola include:
 Pyreneola abyssicola (Brazier, 1877)
 Pyreneola arcuata (Turton, 1932)
 Pyreneola cincinnata (Martens, 1880)
 Pyreneola delineata (Thiele, 1925)
 Pyreneola fulgida (Reeve, 1859)
 Pyreneola leptalea (E.A. Smith, 1902)
 Pyreneola lozoueti Drivas & Jay, 1997
 Pyreneola lurida (Hedley, 1907)
 Pyreneola martae K. Monsecour & D. Monsecour, 2018
 Pyreneola mascarenensis Drivas & Jay, 1990
 Pyreneola melvilli (Hedley, 1835)
 Pyreneola pleurotomoides (Pilsbry, 1895)
 Pyreneola pupa (G.B. Sowerby III, 1894)
 Pyreneola semipicta (G.B. Sowerby III, 1894)
 Pyreneola shepstonensis (E.A. Smith, 1910)
 Pyreneola tuamotuensis K. Monsecour & D. Monsecour, 2018

References

 Habe, T. (1958). On the radulae of Japanese marine gastropods (4). Venus. 20(1): 43-60, pls 2-3

External links

Iredale, T. (1918). Molluscan nomenclatural problems and solutions.- No. 1. Proceedings of the Malacological Society of London. 13(1-2): 28-40

Columbellidae